Ibex Outdoor Clothing, LLC is a producer of wool clothing designed for outdoor use sold through a website and retailers. For the year 2001 Ibex made US$1.5 million in sales, and by 2012 had reached US$12 million in sales. Between 2014 and 2017 sales averaged US$20 Million.

History
The company began when Peter Helmetag and John Fernsell met in 1997. Fernsell  said “Everything looked the same and didn’t work. It was all either Gore-Tex or polyester fleece.” In December 2017, Ibex announced that it would be shutting down its operations in February 2018 after the company's struggles in the outdoor market which led to the company laying off a third of its staff in November.

In October 2019, Ibex relaunched as an online-only store, under the ownership of Flour Fund, which purchased the brand in early 2018, and the direction of Bonnie Shupe, and is now based in Boulder, Colorado.

Wool specialization 
Ibex uses wool as the primary fabric for all its clothing, citing its ability to regulate temperature, anti-microbial properties, ability to wick away sweat, and its resistance to wear.  Merino wool is often used for lighter-weight or casual products, while coarser wool is used for outerwear, such as jackets, vests, often with a Merino lining.

Cow power 
Ibex uses Vermont CVPS Cow Power to generate electricity in a sustainable fashion. According to Business Wire, Ibex consumed over 36,000 kilowatt-hours of electricity in cow power over the year 2005–2006.

References 

Outdoor clothing brands
Clothing companies of the United States
Companies based in Vermont
1997 establishments in Vermont
Clothing companies established in 1997
American companies established in 1997